The term super cyclone (or supercyclone) may refer to:

1999 Odisha cyclone, a strong tropical storm
Cyclone Amphan, a strong tropical storm that affected mainly West Bengal in May 2020
St-Just Super-Cyclone, a Canadian homebuilt aircraft design
Any large tropical cyclone